The Payne Avenue State Bank was designed in the Beaux-Arts style by W. L. Alban in 1923. Located in a predominantly new immigrant area of Saint Paul, Minnesota, United States, the bank initially served Irish, Swedish, German, and Italian immigrants in Saint Paul's East Side neighborhood. The formidable brick building conveyed a sense of permanence to the area residents.

References

Bank buildings on the National Register of Historic Places in Minnesota
Beaux-Arts architecture in Minnesota
Commercial buildings completed in 1923
National Register of Historic Places in Saint Paul, Minnesota